Thy Name Is Woman is a 1924 American silent drama film directed by Fred Niblo and starring Ramon Novarro and Barbara La Marr. A copy of the film survives in the Turner Archive. The film made an estimated profit of more than $100,000.

Plot
As described in a film magazine review, Spanish soldier Juan Ricardo is assigned to obtain evidence against Pedro the Fox, an old smuggler. His acquaintance with Pedro's wife Guerita ripens into mutual love. When Guerita and Juan are about to depart, her elderly husband approaches under the pretense of giving her a farewell kiss, but instead stabs and kills her. Pedro then falls dead from the reactive shock of his own deed. Juan is then arrested and charged with having failed in his mission. The intercession of Dolores, the daughter of the Commandante who is in love with Juan, brings about his release.

Cast
 Ramon Novarro as Juan Ricardo
 Barbara La Marr as Guerita
 William V. Mong as Pedro the Fox (Guerita's husband)
 Wallace MacDonald as Capt. Rodrigo de Castelar
 Robert Edeson as The Commandante
 Edith Roberts as Dolores (The Commandante's daughter)
 Claire McDowell as Juan's mother

See also
 A Devil of a Woman (1951)
 Der Weibsteufel (1966)

References

External links

Stills at silenthollywood.com
Stills from gettyimages.com: Cast #1 and #2, and Scene #1, #2, and #3

1924 films
1924 drama films
Silent American drama films
American silent feature films
Films directed by Fred Niblo
Films produced by Louis B. Mayer
American black-and-white films
American films based on plays
Films set in Spain
Films with screenplays by Bess Meredyth
Metro Pictures films
1920s American films